Glan Peter Martins (born 1 July 1994) is an Indian professional footballer who plays as a defensive midfielder for Indian Super League club ATK Mohun Bagan and the India national team.

Club career
Martins started his career at the SESA Football Academy. In 2014, Martins went to the United States to participate in the USL Pro combine with Combine Rush Soccer Academy where he failed to grab the eye of scouts. He then signed for Sporting Clube de Goa for their Goa Professional League campaign where he played in four matches. Then, on 18 March 2015, it was announced that Martins would be added to Sporting Goa's squad for the remainder of the I-League season as the club were fighting for survival.

He made his professional debut for the club on 2 May 2015 against Bharat. Martins came on as an 88th-minute substitute for Brandon Fernandes as Sporting Goa won 2–0.

International career
He made his international debut for India on 3 June 2021 in the 2022 world cup qualifier against Qatar. He played for 68 minutes in his debut match.

Career statistics

Club

International

Honours

International 

 India
 SAFF Championship: 2021

References

1996 births
Living people
Indian footballers
Sporting Clube de Goa players
Association football midfielders
I-League players
Footballers from Goa
India international footballers
Churchill Brothers FC Goa players
Indian Super League players
ATK Mohun Bagan FC players
FC Goa players